

The Venus of Galgenberg is a Venus figurine of the Aurignacian era, dated to about 30,000 years ago.
The sculpture, also known in German as the Fanny von Galgenberg, was discovered in 1988 close to Stratzing, Austria, not far from the site of the Venus of Willendorf. The two statuettes are normally displayed in the same cabinet at the Museum of Natural History in Vienna, to emphasise the special nature of these two "old ladies", as the curator affectionately calls them.

The figurine measures  in height and weighs 10 g. It is sculpted from shiny green serpentine rock which is found in the immediate vicinity of where the figurine was unearthed.

Because the figurine exhibits a "dancing pose" it was given the nickname of "Fanny" after Fanny Elssler, an Austrian ballerina of the 19th century.

Literature 
 Das neolithische Fundmaterial von St.Pölten/Galgenleithen. in: Mitteilungen der Anthropologischen Gesellschaft in Wien. Wien 108.1978, 50ff. 
 Zur altsteinzeitlichen Besiedlungsgeschichte des Galgenberges von Stratzing/Krems - Rehberg. in: Archäologie Österreichs. Mitteilungen der Österreichischen Gesellschaft für Ur- und Frühgeschichte. Bd 18. Wien 4.1993,1,10 ff. 
 Bednarik, Robert (1989) The Galgenberg figurine from Krems, Austria. Rock Art Research. 6. 118-25

See also
List of Stone Age art
Art of the Upper Paleolithic

References

External links
  Venus vom Galgenberg from the Aeiou Encyclopedia.
Don's maps

Galgenberg

Archaeological discoveries in Austria
Archaeological discoveries in Europe
Aurignacian
Stone sculptures in Austria
1988 archaeological discoveries